The IRFU Women's Interprovincial Series, previously known as the IWRFU Interprovincial Championship, is the top level women's rugby union competition in Ireland. It is organised by the Irish Rugby Football Union. It is the women's equivalent of the IRFU Interprovincial Championship. The competition takes place every December and features four teams representing Connacht, Leinster, Munster and Ulster. The competition effectively acts as a selection trials process for the Ireland women's national rugby union team that competes in the subsequent Women's Six Nations Championship. Since 2016 the IRFU has also organised a similar under 18s competition.

Format
The competition currently uses a round-robin format, similar to the one used in both the Six Nations Championship and the Women's Six Nations Championship. Each team plays the other three teams once. The following year the fixtures are reversed. In previous seasons the competition has also featured playoffs and a final.

Winners

^ Munster win title due to superior points table difference

^^ Both sides finished the campaign with two wins and a loss but Leinster's superior scoring difference +52 during round-robin (Connaught's +26)

^* Both sides finished the campaign with two wins and a draw but Leinster's superior scoring difference +64 during round-robin (Munster's +37)

All-time record

References

 
Women's rugby union competitions in Ireland
Rugby union competitions in Europe for clubs and provinces